David Vasilyevich Bidlovsky (born 22 January 1999) is a Russian football player.

Club career
He made his debut in the Russian Premier League for FC Orenburg on 5 July 2020 in a game against FC Rubin Kazan, replacing Adi Gotlieb in the 65th minute.

References

External links
 
 
 

1999 births
Sportspeople from Sumy
Living people
Russian footballers
Association football midfielders
FC Orenburg players
FC Urozhay Krasnodar players
FC Akron Tolyatti players
Russian Premier League players
Russian Second League players
Russian First League players